The Blueberry River First Nations is an Indian band based in the Peace country in northeast British Columbia. The band is party to Treaty 8.

History 
In April 2020, the nation went into lockdown after COVID-19 struck. 

In May 2021, the Federal Court of Canada ordered the nation's governing council to meet to discuss a petition to have Chief Marvin Yahey removed from his position. The petition had been started by three councillors, alleging a breach of the Chief's fiduciary duties and noting that the council hadn't met in over a year.

Environment  
The band's territory extends over 38 300 square kilometres, including the  Montney Basin. The nation's territory has been marked as an epicentre of oil and gas activity, with extensive industrial presence. Across 73% of the nation's territory, there is at least one road, hydro reservoir, pipeline, or gas well within a 250 metre radius. The construction of the W. A. C. Bennett Dam in the 1960s flooded parts of the nation's territory.

Demographics 
The 2016 Statistics Canada census noted a population increase of 3% from 2006, with a median age of 27.  Total population is 197.

Court cases 
In Yahey v. British Columbia, 2015 (BCSC 1302), the British Columbia Supreme Court dismissed the band's application for a pre-trial injunction to prevent the province from proceeding with a planned auction of 15 timber sale licences.  The court dismissed the application on the basis that it was not satisfied the timber sales would materially increase the cumulative impacts on Treaty rights.

The second application on the same subject was heard in late October 2016.  This time the band sought an injunction to prohibit the Province from authorizing industrial development relating to forestry and oil and gas activities within defined "critical areas".  The court rejected the application for an injunction on the basis that the issue would go to trial in March 2018 and no "irreparable harm" would occur in the meantime.

In June 2021, the British Columbia Supreme Court, in Yahey v. British Columbia, 2021 (BCSC 1287), ruled that the provincial government had breached its Treaty 8 obligations by permitting forestry, energy, and mining development within the Blueberry River First Nation's claim area. Justice Emily Burke ruled that the province had failed to assess that the cumulative effect of approving developments and taking land meant that the nation could not meaningfully exercise its treaty rights. The court declared that the province must halt authorizations that would lead to further breaches, suspended for six months so the parties could negotiate a regulatory scheme.

Impact of the modern economy in 2019 
During an initial trial which began in May 2019, the Province of British Columbia suggested that the First Nation needed to “modernize” its livelihood, with its representative stating that “Reserve lands may provide for the ‘livelihood’ of First Nations in modern times through agriculture, ranching or the exploitation of the subsurface rights.”

The impact of the "modern economy" presented during opening remarks by the representative of Blueberry stated that "projects approved between 2013-2016" included:

 " 2,600 oil and gas wells
 1,884 kilometres of petroleum access and permanent roads
 740 kilometres of petroleum development roads
 1,500 kilometres of new pipelines
 9,400 kilometres of seismic lines, and
 harvesting of approximately 290 forestry cutblocks."

Arguments presented in the case have raised broader questions about assimilation of an indigenous people, and the choice to continue to pursue a traditional way of life.

One commentator expressed concerns regarding the definition of modernity, wondering whether "ever-expanding exploitative resource extraction activities continue to define our moment in time as a society ..  even when science tells us that cumulative impacts are imperiling wildlife survival."

References

First Nations governments in British Columbia
Peace River Country
Assimilation of indigenous peoples of North America
Oil-bearing shales in Canada
Natural gas fields in Canada